Lori Fortress is an 11th-century Armenian fortress located near the Lori Berd village in Lori Province, Armenia. The fortress was built by David Anhoghin to become the capital of Kingdom of Tashir-Dzoraget in 1065.

The Lori Fortress was the site where the Georgian king Giorgi III of Georgia trapped and besieged his rebellious nephew, Demna of Georgia in 1177.

The fortress was captured by the Mongol commander Chagatai the Elder in 1239.

References

Notes

External links
 Armeniapedia.org: Lori Berd
 About Lori Fortress

Archaeological sites in Armenia
Castles in Armenia
Forts in Armenia
Buildings and structures in Lori Province